Isoperla is a genus in the family Perlodidae, also known as the perlodid stoneflies, stripetails or springflies.

Species 

 Isoperla acicularis 
 Isoperla acula 
 Isoperla adunca 
 Isoperla aizuana 
 Isoperla albanica 
 Isoperla alpicola 
 Isoperla altaica 
 Isoperla ambigua 
 Isoperla andreinii 
 Isoperla armeniaca 
 Isoperla asakawae 
 Isoperla asiatica 
 Isoperla auberti 
 Isoperla azusana 
 Isoperla baumanni 
 Isoperla belai 
 Isoperla bellona 
 Isoperla berthelemyi 
 Isoperla bifurcata 
 Isoperla bilineata 
 Isoperla bipartita 
 Isoperla bithynica 
 Isoperla bosnica 
 Isoperla breviptera 
 Isoperla buresi 
 Isoperla burksi 
 Isoperla carbonaria 
 Isoperla carpathica 
 Isoperla chazaudina 
 Isoperla claudiae
 Isoperla chius 
 Isoperla citronella 
 Isoperla conspicua 
 Isoperla cotta 
 Isoperla coushatta 
 Isoperla curtata 
 Isoperla curvispina 
 Isoperla davisi 
 Isoperla debilis 
 Isoperla decepta 
 Isoperla decolorata 
 Isoperla denningi 
 Isoperla dicala 
 Isoperla difformis 
 Isoperla distincta 
 Isoperla emarginata 
 Isoperla evanescens
 Isoperla extensa 
 Isoperla fengi 
 Isoperla flava 
 Isoperla flavescens 
 Isoperla francesca 
 Isoperla frisoni 
 Isoperla fukushimensis 
 Isoperla fulva 
 Isoperla fusca 
 Isoperla gibbsae 
 Isoperla goertzi 
 Isoperla graeca 
 Isoperla grammatica 
 Isoperla gravitans 
 Isoperla hemithales 
 Isoperla holochlora 
 Isoperla hyblaea 
 Isoperla ikariae 
 Isoperla ilvana
 Isoperla inermis 
 Isoperla insularis 
 Isoperla irregularis 
 Isoperla jewetti 
 Isoperla kappa 
 Isoperla karuk 
 Isoperla katmaiensis 
 Isoperla kir 
 Isoperla lata 
 Isoperla laucki 
 Isoperla lesbica 
 Isoperla libanica 
 Isoperla longiseta 
 Isoperla lugens 
 Isoperla lunigera 
 Isoperla luzoni 
 Isoperla major 
 Isoperla marlynia 
 Isoperla marmorata 
 Isoperla maxana 
 Isoperla minima 
 Isoperla miwok 
 Isoperla mohri
 Isoperla montana 
 Isoperla mormona 
 Isoperla moselyi 
 Isoperla motonis 
 Isoperla muir 
 Isoperla namata
 Isoperla nana 
 Isoperla nanchana 
 Isoperla nevada
 Isoperla nigricauda 
 Isoperla nilovana 
 Isoperla nipponica 
 Isoperla obscura 
 Isoperla oenotriae 
 Isoperla okamotonis 
 Isoperla orata 
 Isoperla ordosi 
 Isoperla ornata 
 Isoperla ouachita 
 Isoperla oxylepis 
 Isoperla pallida 
 Isoperla pawlowskii 
 Isoperla petersoni 
 Isoperla peterzwicki 
 Isoperla phalerata 
 Isoperla pinta 
 Isoperla pseudornata 
 Isoperla pusilla 
 Isoperla quinquepunctata 
 Isoperla rainieri 
 Isoperla retroloba 
 Isoperla rhododendri 
 Isoperla richardsoni 
 Isoperla rivulorum 
 Isoperla roguensis 
 Isoperla russevi 
 Isoperla saccai 
 Isoperla sagittata 
 Isoperla shibakawae 
 Isoperla signata 
 Isoperla silesica
 Isoperla similis 
 Isoperla slossonae 
 Isoperla sobria 
 Isoperla sordida 
 Isoperla sowerbyi 
 Isoperla submontana 
 Isoperla sudetica 
 Isoperla suzukii 
 Isoperla szczytkoi 
 Isoperla tilasqua 
 Isoperla towadensis 
 Isoperla transmarina 
 Isoperla trictura 
 Isoperla tripartita 
 Isoperla vevcianensis 
 Isoperla viridinervis 
 Isoperla wenoi 
 Isoperla yangi 
 Isoperla zwicki

References

External links

Perlodidae
Plecoptera genera
Taxa named by Nathan Banks